Lewiston City Hall may refer to:

Lewiston City Hall (Lewiston, Idaho), listed on the National Register of Historic Places in Nez Perce County, Idaho
Lewiston City Hall (Lewiston, Maine), listed on the National Register of Historic Places in Androscoggin County, Maine

Architectural disambiguation pages